The Kel-Tec PMR-30 is a full-size semi-automatic pistol manufactured by Kel-Tec of the United States. It was made available  in 2011. It is chambered in .22 Winchester Magnum Rimfire and the special, factory-shipped, double-stack magazine has a capacity of 30 rounds. The PMR-30 uses fixed fiber optic open sights. The slide is also pre-drilled to allow for the mounting of various red-dot sights with the purchase of appropriate mounting plates from the manufacturer. It has a European-style magazine release.

Much polymer is used in the firearm to save on weight and cost, with a steel slide and barrel and aluminum internal grip frame.

Design
Since its initial market introduction, the PMR-30 has undergone several improvements due to problems with the early available design. The twist rate on the barrel rifling was increased to 1:11 to better stabilize bullets and reduce key-holing.  A stronger, lightly textured polymer is now used for the frame. This eliminates drooping of the frame that created a large gap previously seen between the front of the frame and the barrel. This also gives the frame a less shiny appearance, and a less slick feel in the hand. More metal was added as reinforcement at the breech to completely cover the rim of a loaded cartridge, presumably for increased user safety in the event of a cartridge case head separation.

Kel-Tec also offers an extended 5" threaded barrel for the PMR-30 with an aluminum flash-hider to reduce the high amount of muzzle flash produced by escaping gases. A rifle variant, the CMR-30, is also available.

Ballistics
A standard 40gr .22 Magnum (.22 WMR) round reaches velocities near .

See also

References

External links
 
 User Manual

Semi-auto magnum pistols
Semi-automatic pistols of the United States
Weapons and ammunition introduced in 2011